The following lists events that happened during 2016 in Hungary.

Incumbents
President: János Áder
Prime Minister: Viktor Orbán
Speaker of the National Assembly: László Kövér

Events
 February 28 – Hungarian drama film Son of Saul, directed by László Nemes, wins the award for Best Foreign Language Film at the 88th Academy Awards, becoming the first Hungarian film to win the award since István Szabó's Mephisto in 1981.
 April 12 – The National Assembly repeals a law enacted in March 2015, which banned the majority of retail stores and commercial establishments in the country from opening on Sundays. The decision came into effect four days later.
 October 2 – An overwhelming majority of voters rejected the EU's mandatory migrant quotas with 3,362,224 or 98.36% of the vote.

Deaths

January

 January 1 – Vilmos Zsigmond, cinematographer (b. 1930)
 January 7
 István Komáromi, politician (b. 1943)
 János György Szilágyi, historian (b. 1918)
 January 17 – Jenő Váncsa, politician (b. 1928)

February

 February 11 – Ferenc Rudas, footballer and coach (b. 1921)
 February 25 – Irén Psota, actress (b. 1929)

March

 March 7 – Béla Kuharszki, footballer (b. 1940)
 March 13 – József Verebes, footballer and coach (b. 1941)
 March 17 – Zoltán Kamondi, film director, screenwriter and producer (b. 1960)
 March 20 – Sándor Csjef, amateur boxer (b. 1950)
 March 25 – Imre Pozsgay, politician (b. 1933)
 March 30 – Marianne Krencsey, actress (b. 1931)
 March 31
 Béla Biszku, politician (b. 1921)
 Imre Kertész, writer and Nobel Prize laureate (b. 1929)

April

 April 1 – Emil Keres, actor and theatre director (b. 1925)
 April 2 – László Sárosi, footballer and coach (b. 1932)
 April 7 – László Bárczay, chess player (b. 1936)
 April 18 – Zoltán Szarka, footballer and coach (b. 1942)
 April 21 – Ferenc Paragi, javelin thrower (b. 1953)

See also
Hungary at the 2016 Summer Olympics
List of Hungarian films since 1990

References

 
2010s in Hungary
Years of the 21st century in Hungary
Hungary
Hungary